Vice Admiral Sir John Anthony Rose Troup,  (18 July 1921 – 8 July 2008) was a Royal Navy officer. A submariner, he served as the last Commander-in-Chief Far East Fleet (1971).

Early life
Born in Bath, Somerset, on 18 July 1921, Troup was the son of Hugh Rose Troup (1885–1968), an officer in the Royal Navy who played an important role in the evacuation from Dunkirk in 1940.

Naval career
Troup studied at Pangbourne College, associated with the nautical training college HMS Worcester, until 1934. He joined the Royal Navy in 1934, and studied at the Royal Naval College in Dartmouth until 1936.

Troup served in the Second World War, initially on the cruisers  in 1938–39 and then  in 1939–40. He served on the submarine  from September 1941 to early 1943, commanded by John "Tubby" Linton in the 10th Submarine Flotilla. After briefly commanding  in June to August 1943, he was commanding officer of the submarine  from September 1943 until the end of the war, based at Trincomalee.

Troup was mentioned in despatches in September 1942, and then received the Distinguished Service Cross (DSC) in May 1943, both awarded for his submarine patrols in the Mediterranean, and was awarded a Bar to the DSC in August 1945 for his patrols in the Far East.

He was appointed second-in-command of the aircraft carrier  in 1956, commanding officer of the 3rd Submarine Squadron in 1961 and then captain of the ship  from 1966 to 1968.

Troup went on to be Flag Officer Sea Training in 1969 and was the last Commander-in-Chief, Far East Fleet in 1971. He was made Flag Officer Submarines in 1972 and Flag Officer, Scotland and Northern Ireland in 1974. He was appointed a Knight Commander of the Order of the Bath in 1975, and retired in 1977.

Family and later life
In 1943, Troup married Joy Gordon-Smith: by his first marriage he had two sons and a daughter. In 1953 he married Cordelia Hope: they also had two sons (including Edward Troup, born 1955) and a daughter.

Troup joined the Royal Yacht Squadron in 1964. In retirement, he became vice-chairman and group managing director of the shipbuilder Vosper Thornycroft.

References

|-

|-

|-

1921 births
2008 deaths
Knights Commander of the Order of the Bath
Recipients of the Distinguished Service Cross (United States)
Royal Navy vice admirals
Royal Navy officers of World War II
Royal Navy submarine commanders
Military personnel from Somerset